Humble Pie were an English hard rock band from Moreton, Essex. Formed in January 1969, the group originally included vocalist and guitarist Steve Marriott, guitarist and vocalist Peter Frampton, bassist and vocalist Greg Ridley, and drummer Jerry Shirley. After several lineup changes and breakups, the group's final tour in 2002 featured drummer Shirley alongside bassist and vocalist Ridley (previously a member of the original lineup from 1969 to 1975), guitarist and vocalist Bobby Tench (previously a member from 1980 to 1981), lead vocalist and guitarist Johnny Warman, guitarist Dave "Bucket" Colwell and keyboardist Dean Rees, keyboardist Zoot Money, bassist Nigel Harrison, guitarist Clem Clempson and vocalist Dave Walker.

History

1969–1983
Humble Pie were formed as a supergroup in January 1969 by Steve Marriott of Small Faces, Peter Frampton of the Herd, Greg Ridley of Spooky Tooth and Jerry Shirley of the Apostolic Intervention. Frampton remained until September 1971, when he left to start a solo career. The band's manager Dee Anthony explained that Frampton's departure was due to a lack of chemistry between him and Marriott, and suggested that the group would continue as a trio. However, he was replaced later in the year by former Colosseum guitarist David "Clem" Clempson. Humble Pie broke up in 1975 after the release of Street Rats, due to touring fatigue and personal conflicts.

Marriott and Shirley reformed Humble Pie in January 1980, adding guitarist Bobby Tench and bassist Anthony "Sooty" Jones. Both new members left in the summer of 1981 after a period of heavy touring. Marriott returned early the following year with bassist Jim Leverton, keyboardist Goldy McJohn and drummer Fallon Williams III, often billing themselves as "Steve Marriott and the Pie". McJohn was soon fired and Leverton later left, with guitarist Tommy Johnson and bassist Keith Christopher joining in early 1983; Johnson was subsequently dismissed and replaced by Phil Dix, and later by Rick Richards, who was fired alongside Christopher later in the year. Following a brief period as a trio with Williams and bassist Dave Hewitt, Marriott disbanded Humble Pie for a second time in late 1983.

1989–2002
In 1989, Shirley obtained the rights to the name Humble Pie and reformed the band in Cleveland, Ohio as "Humble Pie featuring Jerry Shirley", adding lead vocalist and guitarist Charlie Huhn, lead guitarist Wally Stocker and returning bassist Jones. In the early 1990s, Marriott and Frampton worked together again, with a return of the original Humble Pie lineup touted as a future possibility; however, Marriott died in a house fire on 20 April 1991, ending the possibility. Shirley continued performing under the Humble Pie name with various musicians until August 1999, when he was forced to retire after suffering injuries in a car accident. Huhn completed a string of shows with guitarists Rick Craig (later Patrick Thomas), bassists Ean Evans and Kent Gascoyne, and drummer Jamie Darnell (who left to join Foghat in February 2000.)

Shirley reformed Humble Pie again in 2001 to mark the tenth anniversary of Marriott's death, adding original bassist Ridley, former guitarist Tench and new guitarist Dave "Bucket" Colwell, all of whom performed on the band's first studio album since 1981, Back on Track. The group later added keyboardist Dean Rees and vocalist and guitarist Johnny Warman for a short European tour in 2002, which was cut short when Ridley was forced to retire due to pneumonia. The illness ultimately led to his death on 19 November 2003.

Members

Current

Former

Timeline

Lineups

References

Humble Pie